The second USS Boston was a 24-gun frigate, launched 3 June 1776 by Stephen and Ralph Cross, Newburyport, Massachusetts, and completed the following year. In American service she captured a number of British vessels. The British captured Boston at the fall of Charleston, South Carolina, renamed her HMS Charlestown (HMS Charleston or Charles Town), and took her into service. She was engaged in one major fight with two French frigates, which she survived and which saved the convoy she was protecting. The British sold Charlestown in 1783, immediately after the end of the war.

American service
Boston was commissioned under the command of Captain Hector McNeill. American Tartar parted from the two frigates shortly thereafter.

The two frigates captured three prizes including the 28-gun frigate  (7 June). The British captured Hancock and Fox, but Boston escaped to the Sheepscot River on the Maine coast. McNeill was court-martialed in June 1779 for his failure to support Hancock and was dismissed from the Navy.

During the period 15 February-31 March 1778, Boston, now under the command of Samuel Tucker, carried John Adams to France, capturing on 11 March the British letter of marque Martha, which the British later recaptured. She then cruised in European waters taking four prizes before returning to Portsmouth, New Hampshire, 15 October. On 5 May 1778 a Midshipman, Peter Cavee, fell overboard and drowned in port at Bordeaux, France. In 1779 she made two cruises (29 July – 6 September and 23 November – 23 December) in the North Atlantic capturing at least nine prizes. Boston then joined the squadron sent to assist in the defense of Charleston, South Carolina. There the British captured her when the town surrendered on 12 May 1780.

British service
The British took Boston into service as HMS Charlestown. In June 1781 Admiral Mariot Arbuthnot sent Charlestown and several other vessels to attempt to block some French reinforcements from entering Boston. On 7 July, the squadron that Arbuthnot sent to Boston recaptured the British sloop-of-war , which the American frigate  had captured on 27 May. Then Charlestown sent in two American privateers that she had taken, Flying Fish and Yankee Hero.

Next, Charlestown took part in the action of 21 July 1781. She was one of five Royal Navy ships escorting a convoy of 13 colliers and merchant vessels. The escorts also included the two sloops-of-war Allegiance and Vulture, the armed transport , and Jack, another small armed merchant ship. The French captured Jack. Charlestown struck to the French frigates but they were unable to take possession of her; French accounts state that she escaped in the dark. The French lost six men killed and 34 wounded; the British lost some 17 or so men killed and 48 wounded. Charlestown alone lost 8 men killed, including Evans, and 29 men wounded. The merchant vessels and their cargoes of coal entered Spanish River safely. Charlestown and the sloops sailed back to Halifax.

Lieutenant Rupert George of Vulture replaced Evans as captain of Charlestown. He was posted on 29 November 1781 and remained her captain.

Fate
The Royal Navy sold Charlestown in 1783.

See also

List of sailing frigates of the United States Navy
List of ships captured in the 18th century
Bibliography of early American naval history

Citations and references
Citations

References
Brown, Richard (F.G.S.) (1899) The coal fields and coal trade of the island of Cape Breton. (Maritime Mining Record Office).
Clowes, W. Laird, et al. (1897–1903) The royal navy: a history from the earliest times to the present. (Boston: Little, Brown and Co.; London: S. Low, Marston and Co.).
Demerliac, Alain (1996) La Marine De Louis XVI: Nomenclature Des Navires Français De 1774 À 1792. (Nice: Éditions OMEGA). 
 

Ships of the Continental Navy
Ships built in Newburyport, Massachusetts
Sailing frigates of the United States Navy
1776 ships
Captured ships
Frigates of the Royal Navy